is a former Japanese football player and manager. He currently in charge of J2 League club Montedio Yamagata.

Playing career
Watanabe was born in Hinode, Tokyo on October 10, 1973. After graduating from Komazawa University, he joined Japan Football League (JFL) club Consadole Sapporo in 1996. However he could not play many matches. In 1997, he moved to JFL club Ventforet Kofu. He became a regular player as center back from first season and the club was promoted to new league J2 League from 1999. Although he played as regular player, the club finished at bottom place for 2 years in a row (1999-2000). In 2001, he moved to J2 club Vegalta Sendai. He played many matches as regular center back with Ricardo and the club won the 2nd place and was promoted to J1 League from 2002. However the club gained Norio Omura and Watanabe could hardly play in the match behind Omura in 2002. Although he played many matches instead Omura in late 2003, the club was relegated to J2 from 2004. He could hardly play in the match in 2004 and retired end of 2004 season.

Coaching career

Vegalta Sendai 
After retirement, Watanabe started coaching career at Vegalta Sendai in 2005. In 2008, he became a top team coach. In April 2014, the club results were bad and manager Graham Arnold was sacked when the club was at the 17th place of 18 clubs. Watanabe became a new manager as Arnold successor. Vegalta finished at the 14 the place in 2014 season and remained in J1. Vegalta won the runners-up in 2018 Emperor's Cup.

Renofa Yamaguchi 
In 2021, he signed with J2 League club Renofa Yamaguchi FC.

Montedio Yamagata 
In 2022, he signed a contract with J2 League club Montedio Yamagata as a coach.

Club statistics

Managerial statistics
Update; December 31, 2019

Honours 
Vegalta Sendai

 Emperor's Cup
 Runners-up: 2018

Individual

 Monthly Best coach: 2019(June)

References

External links
 
 
 

1973 births
Living people
Komazawa University alumni
Association football people from Tokyo
Japanese footballers
J1 League players
J2 League players
Japan Football League (1992–1998) players
Hokkaido Consadole Sapporo players
Ventforet Kofu players
Vegalta Sendai players
Japanese football managers
J1 League managers
J2 League managers
Vegalta Sendai managers
Renofa Yamaguchi FC managers
Association football defenders